The Campaign to Suppress Bandits in Northern Guangdong was a counter-guerrilla / counterinsurgency campaign the communists fought against the nationalist guerrilla that was mostly consisted of bandits and nationalist regular troops left behind after the nationalist government withdrew from mainland China.  The campaign was fought during the Chinese Civil War in the post-World War II era, and resulted in communist victory.  This campaign is part of the Campaign to Suppress Bandits in Guangdong.

Strategies
The nationalists had faced a precarious dilemma in waging the campaign against its communist enemy because of complex situation they had faced, and consequently, made several grave miscalculations which contributed to their eventual failure.

Nationalist miscalculations
Like other nationalist futile attempts to fight guerrilla and insurgency warfare against the communists after being driven off from mainland China, the very first grave strategic miscalculation made by the retreating nationalist government contributed at least equally if not greater than the enemy's political and military pressure to the nationalist defeat in this campaign.  The very first strategic miscalculation made by the retreating nationalist government was identical to the earlier one the nationalist government had made immediately after World War II, when it had neither the sufficient troops nor enough transportation assets to be deployed into the Japanese-occupied regions of China, and unwilling to let these regions falling into communist hands, the nationalist government ordered the Japanese and their turncoat Chinese puppet government not to surrender to the communists and allowed them to keep their fighting capabilities to "maintain order" in the Japanese occupied regions by fighting off the communists.  This earlier miscalculation resulted in further alienation and resentment to the nationalist government by the local population, which had already blamed the nationalists for losing the regions to the Japanese invaders during the war.  Half a decade later when the nationalists were driven from mainland China, they had made the similar miscalculation once again in their desperation, this time by enlisting the help of local bandits to fight the communists, and ordering the nationalist troops left behind to join these bandits in the struggle against the communism.  However, the bandits were deeply feared and hated by the local populace they plagued for so long, and nationalist troops left behind joining the bandits certainly did not help them win the support of the general population.  In fact, it served the exact opposite, strengthening the popular support of their communist enemy.

The second grave strategic miscalculation made by the retreating nationalist government was also similar to the one the nationalist government had made immediately after World War II, when it attempted to simultaneously solve the warlord problem that had plagued China for so long with the problem of the exterminating communists together: those warlords allied with Chiang Kai-shek's nationalist government were only interested in keeping their own power and defected to the Japanese side when Japanese invaders offered to let them keep their power in exchange for their collaborations.  After World War II, these forces of former Japanese puppet governments once again returned to the nationalist camp for the same reason they defected to the Japanese invaders. Obviously, it was difficult for Chiang to immediately get rid of these warlords for good as soon as they surrendered to Chiang and rejoined nationalists, because such move would alienate other factions within the nationalist ranks, and those former Japanese puppet government's warlords could still help the nationalists to by holding on to what was under their control and fighting off communists, and they and the communists would both be weakened.  Similarly, the bandits the nationalist governments had failed to exterminate were obviously not good candidates for evacuation to Taiwan half a decade later, and using them to fight communists appeared to be the only logical alternative.  If the communists were great weakened by the bandits, then it would the nationalists would have easier time in their counterattacks to retake China.  If the bandits were defeated, then the nationalists would have easier job to eradicate them later after retaking China.  However, just like those warlords, these bandits were only interested in keeping their own power also, and thus did not put any real efforts to fight the communists like some of the nationalists who were dedicated to their political cause.  The eradication of bandits by the communist government only strengthened its popular support since previous governments (including the nationalist government itself) dating back from Qing Dynasty had failed to do so.

The third grave strategic miscalculation made by the retreating nationalist government was similar to the second one, but this one was about its own troops left behind.  The nationalist government had faced a dilemma: the highly disciplined troops were in desperate need to defend Taiwan, the last nationalist island sanctuary.  The less disciplined second rate and undisciplined third rate troops, both of which mostly consisted of warlords' troop were definitely not suited to be withdrawn to defend the last stand nationalists had made, and they were not given the top priority for evacuation.  Instead, they were left behind to fight the communists behind the enemy line, but such move had alienated many of the troops left behind, and it was impossible to expect them to fight their communist enemy with the same kind of dedication like those nationalist agents who believed in their political cause.  Compounding the problem, due to the need of bandits' knowledge of local area, they were often rewarded with higher ranks than the nationalist troops left behind.  As a result, the former-nationalist regular troops turned guerrilla fighters lacked any willingness to work together with the bandits they once attempted to exterminate, especially when many of the bandits had killed their comrades-in-arms earlier in the battles of eradications / pacifications.  Many loyal nationalists were enraged by the fact that they had to serve under the former-enemy they once fought.  Similarly, the bandits lacked the similar willingness and attempted to expend those nationalist troops whenever they could in order to save their own skin.

The fourth grave strategic miscalculation made by the retreating nationalist government was financial / economical: due to the lack of money, those bandits turned guerrillas were mostly provided with arms, but not sufficient supplies and money.  The bandits turned guerrilla had no problem of looting the local population to get what they need, as they had done for decades, which inevitably drove the general popular support further into the communist side.  The little financial support provided by the nationalist government was simply not enough to support such guerrilla and insurgency warfare on such a large scale.  Another unexpected but disastrous result of the insufficient financial support was that it had greatly eroded the support of the nationalist government within its own ranks.  The wealthy landowners and businessmen were the strong supporters of nationalist government and as their properties were confiscated by the communists and redistributed to the poor, their hatred toward the communist government was enough to cause many of them to stay behind voluntarily to fight behind the enemy line.  However, the landowners and businessmen were also longtime victims of bandits due to their wealth, and many of them had suffered even more than the general populace who had far less wealth.  As these former landowners and businessmen turned guerrilla fighters were ordered to join their former bandits who once threatened, looted, kidnapped and even killed them and their relatives, it was obvious that such cooperation was mostly in name only and could not produce any actual benefits, and the alienation and discontent toward the nationalist government harbored by these once ardent nationalists would only grow greater.

Another problem for the nationalists was the strong disagreement among themselves over how to fight the war against their communist enemy.   Military professionals preferred to fight a total war, incapacitate the enemy's ability to fight, but this inevitably conflicted with the interest of another faction of strong supporters of the nationalist government: the landowners and businessmen, who joined bandits to oppose such tactic.  The reason was that landowners and businessmen supporting and joining the nationalist guerrilla firmly believed that the nationalists would be able to retake mainland China within several years and they would be able to regain their lost lands, businesses, and other properties that were confiscated and redistributed to the poor by the communists.  As the nationalist military professionals in the guerrilla suggested and destroyed the production facilities and businesses as part of the total war, the landowners and businessmen would not be able to regain any valuable properties after the return of the nationalist government because those properties had been destroyed.  The bandits agreed with the businessmen and landowners to oppose the idea of total war for a different reason: when the properties were destroyed and productivity dropped, they would not be able to loot enough supply to survive.  As a result, despite the animosities between the bandits and landowners and businessmen, they were united together in the opposition to the military professional faction of the nationalists.

Communist strategies
In contrast to the nationalists, the communists had much simpler but effective strategy because they did not have the dilemma the nationalists had, all they had to do was to eradicate bandits.  The job of fighting a counterinsurgency and counter guerrilla war was made much easier for the communists by the grave strategic miscalculations nationalists had made themselves, and the communists exploited these to the maximum for their advantage.  As with all other bandit eradication campaigns, the most important communist strategy was to mobilize the entire population to fight the bandits, and furthermore, additional strategies were devised specifically to fit the local situation to fight the bandits.

Order of battle
Nationalists
Anti-communist National Salvation Army
Communists
132nd Division

1st Stage
As the nationalists withdrew from Guangzhou to escape the advancing communists, the nationalist military intelligence head Mao Renfeng (毛人凤) ordered Li Jilan (李及兰), the nationalist commander-in-chief of Guangzhou Garrison to organize local bandits to fight a guerrilla war against the communists, causing as much damage as possible to the enemy.  This was achieved via providing bandits with weaponry and money in silver, and sending agents to each band of bandits as advisors.  The local bandits were united under the command of Anti-communist National Salvation Army.  In response, the communists launched a campaign to suppress these local bandits, an effort headed by the communist 132nd Division.

The Fifth Hamlet (Wucun, 五村) of the Triple Mountain (Sanshan, 三山) Township of Yingde was the home base of bandits headed by Ou Yang (欧阳), who established his reign ruthlessly by executing those who are suspected of being sympathetic of communists.  Additionally, the hamlet chief was punished as well, fined heavily in terms of rice that totaled 1,200 kg.  However, such brutal acts only alienated him and his fellow bandits from the local population, with many of them fleeing their homes to escape the bandits.  Despite the initial fear and reluctance to talk to the communists when the communist 2nd Company of the 394th Regiment of the 132nd Division first entered the hamlet in September 1950, the local populace was soon won over by the communists, nine of villagers joined the communist forces, while those who fled their homes also returned, after hearing the good words about communists from those who stayed behind and met the communists.  On November 19, 1950, communist forces set up an ambush in the area where Ou Yang was known to be, the foothills of the Changbeng (长崩) Mountain based on the intelligence provided by the local populace.  Around 8:00 pm, Ou Yang and his bodyguard approached the communists in hiding, but discovered the ambush and opened up on the communists first.  The communists returned fire and managed to kill Ou Yang's bodyguard, and wounded his leg.  The next, following the blood trial, communists captured Ou Yang in a cave.  With their chieftain captured alive, the surviving bandits in Ou Yang's band dispersed and went into hiding in the mountains.

In the border region of Yingde and Yangshan (阳山), there was another band of bandits headed by a father – son team.  During the bandit suppression campaign, the father, Huang Yuan (黄元), was first captured by the communists.  Huang Yang (黄阳), the son, refused to surrender and in his desperate attempt to escape, he ordered his bandits to kidnap more than a dozen innocent young children as a human shield.  As they had made their successful escape, the young children obviously could not keep up with bandits.  Feeling the children were slowing them down, Huang Yang ordered all of them to be executed.  The atrocities committed by Huang Yang had completed alienated the local populace and drove his very last sympathizers to the communist side, who provided intelligence to the communists on the bandits whereabouts from then on.  On December 17, 1950, based on the intelligence provided by the local populations, communist 394th Regiment begun their search in the Yali (鸦理) Mountains in the region to the west of the Liumei (流眉) region.  After one and half a day of search, the hiding place of Huang Yang was discovered and in the gunfight that followed, Huang Yang managed to wound three communists but all of his bandits were killed, and Huang Yang himself severely wounded.  As communists approached, Huang Yang fired a last shot, wounding two communists with on bullet, before he was killed by the returning fire from the communists. This marked the end of large scale battles in the campaign, and the following operation became eradication operations on much smaller scale.

2nd Stage
With bandits dispersed and went into hiding, the communists changed their tactics accordingly in the following mopping up operations.  Political pressure increased with the mobilization of local population, with a team of three to five members stationed in every hamlet.  In addition, ordinary bandits were treated differently than their chieftains in an attempt to convince them to give themselves up, and the practice proved to be effective, especially in the area that had been plagued by bandits previously, such as in the Yellow Flower (Huanghua, 黄花) township of Yingde.

Wang Min (王敏), the deputy political commissar of the communist 2nd Company led his team to station in the Weishan (唯山) hamlet of the Yellow Flower (Huanghua, 黄花) township of Yingde.  One night, the local populace reported that a bandit had returned to the hamlet and the communists managed to capture him.  Based on the interrogation, another bandit returning to the hamlet was also captured on the next day.  The bandits were soon convinced to switch to the communist side, leading a communist platoon to the hiding place of their former chieftain, Liu Yu (刘裕), the nationalist regimental commander of 2nd Regiment of the Northern River Column of the Anti-communist National Salvation Army.  Liu Yu managed to narrow escape his capture, but both of his concubines were captured alive by the communists.  Because Liu Yu's two concubines did not commit any crimes, they were soon released, and to help them settle down for a new life, food and vegetables were provided to them at no cost.  The concubines were very grateful and volunteered to write to Liu Yu to ask him to give himself up, which he did.  After turning himself in, it was discovered Liu Yu only joined the nationalist guerrilla but he and his bandits did not commit any serious crime against the general population like Huang Yang, so Liu Yu was soon released also.  To help him to settle down to a new life, food and agricultural production tools were provide to him and his family free of charge.  This policy had since become a wide practice in the local region, succeeding in convincing more than 230 bandits to surrender to the communist 395th Regiment stationed in the area, and only 8 bandits were killed for refusing to surrender.

The success at the Yellow Flower township was adopted by the others in the entire northern Guangdong, and with emphasis on the relatives of those bandits.  The result was that not only low-ranking bandits, but also their chieftains begun to turn themselves in, including Ou Yang's relatives, such as Ou Yakang (欧亚康), Ou Shenmei (欧沈妹), Ou Yazhang (欧亚章) and 28 other bandit chieftains.  As the general population turned to the communists and many of their comrades-in-arms turned themselves in, the surviving bandits found it increasingly difficult to operate and recruit.  The commander-in-chief of the bandits turned nationalist guerrilla, Liang Mengxiong (梁猛熊), was reduced to recruit and resupply by death threats, executing those who dared to say no.  However, executing civilians who refused to corporate only further drive the general population away, into the communist sides.  As a result, the bandits were reduced to a mere dozen, all of them were eventually captured in caves, and Liang Mengxiong was barely able to escape with his own life, becoming the only one who had successfully managed to escape.  Fearing that he would be prosecuted for his rapid failure by the nationalist government, Liang Mengxiong dared not to flee to Taiwan, but instead, fled overseas.  Ironically, many of Liang Mengxiong's relatives, including his distant nephew Liang Daping (梁达平) and niece Liang Shaomei (梁少梅) joined the communists during the campaign, and eventually became important officers in the People's Liberation Army local garrison.  After four months of operations, by the end of January 1951, the local bandits were completely eradicated and the communist 132nd Division was reassigned to a different task of supporting land reforms in Zengcheng, Dongguan and Boluo (博罗).

Outcome
Although sharing the common anticommunist goal, the nationalist guerrilla and insurgency warfare was largely handicapped by the enlistment of bandits, many of whom had fought and killed nationalist troops earlier in the eradication / pacification campaign, and also looted, kidnapped and even killed landlords and business owners, an important faction that supported the nationalist government, but now must united against the common enemy, which is half-hearted at the best. Compounding the problem further with additional differences within the ranks of the nationalist guerillas themselves, the futile nationalist guerrilla and insurgency warfare against its communist enemy was destined to fail.

See also
List of battles of the Chinese Civil War
National Revolutionary Army
History of the People's Liberation Army
Chinese Civil War

References

Zhu, Zongzhen and Wang, Chaoguang, Liberation War History, 1st Edition, Social Scientific Literary Publishing House in Beijing, 2000,  (set)
Zhang, Ping, History of the Liberation War, 1st Edition, Chinese Youth Publishing House in Beijing, 1987,  (pbk.)
Jie, Lifu, Records of the Liberation War: The Decisive Battle of Two Kinds of Fates, 1st Edition, Hebei People's Publishing House in Shijiazhuang, 1990,  (set)
Literary and Historical Research Committee of the Anhui Committee of the Chinese People's Political Consultative Conference, Liberation War, 1st Edition, Anhui People's Publishing House in Hefei, 1987, 
Li, Zuomin, Heroic Division and Iron Horse: Records of the Liberation War, 1st Edition, Chinese Communist Party History Publishing House in Beijing, 2004, 
Wang, Xingsheng, and Zhang, Jingshan, Chinese Liberation War, 1st Edition, People's Liberation Army Literature and Art Publishing House in Beijing, 2001,  (set)
Huang, Youlan, History of the Chinese People's Liberation War, 1st Edition, Archives Publishing House in Beijing, 1992, 
Liu Wusheng, From Yan'an to Beijing: A Collection of Military Records and Research Publications of Important Campaigns in the Liberation War, 1st Edition, Central Literary Publishing House in Beijing, 1993, 
Tang, Yilu and Bi, Jianzhong, History of Chinese People's Liberation Army in Chinese Liberation War, 1st Edition, Military Scientific Publishing House in Beijing, 1993 – 1997,  (Volum 1), 7800219615 (Volum 2), 7800219631 (Volum 3), 7801370937 (Volum 4), and 7801370953 (Volum 5)

Battles of the Chinese Civil War
1950 in China
1951 in China
Campaigns to Suppress Bandits